Yukio Stinson Peter (born 29 January 1984 in Aiwo) is a weightlifter from Nauru.

Career

2004
Yukio snatched 142.5 kg and clean and jerked 165 kg (total 307.5 kg) to place eighth at the 2004 Olympic Games in the Men's 69 kg division. It is the best position ever for a Nauruan athlete at the Olympic Games.

2008
In December 2008, Yukio won a gold medal in the Commonwealth Weightlifting Championships in Limassol, Cyprus. Competing in the 77 kg category, he snatched 145 kg and clean and jerked 185 kg.

2010
At the 2010 Commonwealth Games in New Delhi, India, Yukio Peter won Nauru's 10th gold medal-winning the 77kg division in weightlifting with a new Games record of 333 kg.

2011
Peter won gold in the 77 kg category at the Arafura Games in 2011 in Darwin - Nauru's first gold at that edition of the Games.

References

External links
 
 "Nauruan lifter is back"; Pacific Islands News Association, 2 October 2008

1984 births
Living people
Nauruan male weightlifters
Olympic weightlifters of Nauru
Weightlifters at the 2004 Summer Olympics
Weightlifters at the 2010 Commonwealth Games
Commonwealth Games gold medallists for Nauru
People from Aiwo District
Commonwealth Games medallists in weightlifting
Medallists at the 2010 Commonwealth Games